James F. Jackson  (born February 10, 1947) is a retired United States Air Force lieutenant general who served as Chief of the Air Force Reserve and Commander of the Air Force Reserve Command.

Military career
Jackson was commissioned as a second lieutenant in the United States Air Force following his graduation from the United States Air Force Academy in 1978. For the next 14 years, he served as an active-duty instructor pilot and evaluator, accumulating over 3600 flight hours in the F-4 Phantom, F-16 Fighting Falcon, and KC-135 Stratotanker. In 1990, he completed a Master of Science degree at Embry-Riddle Aeronautical University. In 1992, he transferred to the Air Force Reserve. From 2010 to 2012, Jackson was Deputy Chief of Air Force Reserve. In July 2012, he was promoted to the position of Chief of Air Force Reserve and Commander, Air Force Reserve Command. He has a total of 3,600 flying hours in various aircraft types. He retired from the US Air Force on August 1, 2016.

Awards and decorations

Dates of promotion

References

1951 births
Living people
Recipients of the Air Force Distinguished Service Medal
Recipients of the Legion of Merit
United States Air Force Academy alumni
United States Air Force generals
United States Air Force reservists